The Udege language (also Udihe language, Udekhe language, Udeghe language) is the language of the Udege people. It is a member of the Tungusic family.

History
Previously an oral language, in 1931 an alphabet was created for writing Udege as a part of latinisation in the Soviet Union.
In 1938 the policy of latinisation was reversed and the written Udige language was banned by Soviet authorities.  Books in Udihe were collected and burned. , an Udige language author and translator was declared an enemy of the people and executed.

Vocabulary
Udege contains a variety of loanwords from the closely related Nanai language, which have supplanted some older Udege vocabulary, such as:

 [banixe] (thank you), from Nanai [banixa], instead of Udege [usasa]
  (work), from Nanai , instead of Udege 
In general, a large degree of mutual assimilation of the two languages has been observed in the Bikin region. Udege has also exerted phonological influence on the Bikin dialect of Nanai, including monophthongisation of diphthongs, denasalisation of nasal vowels, deletion of reduced final vowels, epenthetic vowels preventing consonant final words, and the deletion of intervocalic [w].

Orthography

Udege is currently written in two versions of the Cyrillic alphabet, known as the "Petersburg" and the "Khabarovsk" versions. The Khabarovsk version is used more often.

A few older letters that were used in this language: Ж ж, З з, Љ љ, Ц ц, Ш ш, Щ щ, Ъ ъ, Ы ы, ‘Ы ‘ы, Ы̄ ы̄, Ы̂ ы̂, Ю ю, ‘Ю ‘ю, Ю̄ ю̄, Ю̂ ю̂, Я я, ‘Я ‘я, Я̄ я̄, Я̂ я̂

Phonology

Examples 
The beginning of the fairy tale "Selemege":

Notes

Bibliography

External links
 Chukchi fairy tales in Udihe (Udehe) and English
 Максим Руссо. Карта языков России: удэгейский (Полит.ру, 10 марта 2019)

Agglutinative languages
Critically endangered languages
Khabarovsk Krai
Languages of Russia
Tungusic languages